1993 Verdy Kawasaki season

Review and events
Verdy Kawasaki won J.League NICOS series (second stage).

League results summary

League results by round

Competitions

Domestic results

J.League

Suntory series

NICOS series

J.League Championship

Emperor's Cup

J.League Cup

International results

Asian Club Championship

Player statistics

 † player(s) joined the team after the opening of this season.
NoteThe match data of the Asian Club Championship 2nd Round-1 (v. Eastern) is unknown.

Transfers

In:

Out:

Transfers during the season

In
Keizō Adachi
Henny Meijer (on May)
Gène Hanssen (from Roda JC on May)
Eric van Rossum (on July)
Bismarck (from Vasco da Gama on July)
Paulo (from Botafogo FC on September)

Out
Henny Meijer (on July)
Gène Hanssen (on July)
Hisashi Katō (to Shimizu S-Pulse on July)
Eric van Rossum (on January)

Awards
J.League Most Valuable Player: Kazuyoshi Miura
J.League Best XI: Pereira, Tetsuji Hashiratani, Ruy Ramos, Kazuyoshi Miura
J.League Cup Most Valuable Player: Bismarck

References

Other pages
 J. League official site
 Tokyo Verdy official site

Verdy Kawasaki
Tokyo Verdy seasons